Advent Parallax is the fourth and final studio album released by American black metal band Averse Sefira.  It was released on February 12, 2008 on Candelight Records, with a vinyl pressing by independent label The Ajna Offensive.  Over the course of its eight tracks, it is divided into 4 sections, "Anoint" (tracks 1 & 2), "Alight" (tracks 3 & 4), "Align" (tracks 5 & 6) and "Shine" (tracks 7 & 8).  The credits proudly state that "No keyboards were used in this recording."

Track listing
All songs written by Averse Sefira. (Copyright Abstract Sounds/Tanglade Music)

"Descension" – 7:05
"Séance In A Warrior's Memory" – 7:55
"Viral Kinesis" – 7:29
"Cognition Of Rebirth" – 6:28
"Serpent Recoil" – 5:39
"A Shower Of Idols" – 6:13
"Refractions Of An Exploded Singularity" – 9:03
"Vomitorium Angelis" – 7:28

Personnel

Averse Sefira
Sanguine Mapsama – guitars, vocal
Wrath – bass, vocal
Lady of the Evening Faces – effects
The Carcass – drums, percussion

Additional musicians
Ross Dolan (of the death metal band Immolation) – additional vocals

Production
Recorded, Produced, Engineered, Mixed & Mastered By Tore Stjerna

References

External links
Advent Parallax at Discogs

2008 albums
Averse Sefira albums
Candlelight Records albums